Gwangju University began in 1981 as a four-year college in Jinwol-dong, Nam-gu, Gwangju, named Gwangju Gyeongsang Jeonmun Daehak. 

It now has three graduate schools and four colleges with more than fifteen thousand students.

Notable people
Kim Na-woon, actress
K.J. Choi, professional golfer

Notes

External links 
  
  

Educational institutions established in 1981
Universities and colleges in Gwangju
Nam District, Gwangju
1981 establishments in South Korea